The Cullen Hotel, in Salt Lake City, Utah, was a five-story hotel built by 1901.  Also known as The Cullen, it was owned by Matthew Cullen.

Frederick U. Leonard, who married a daughter of Cullen, rose to presidency of some of Cullen's enterprises and was a director of the hotel. 

It was designed by architect Richard K. A. Kletting.

References

Hotels in Utah
Hotel buildings completed in 1901
1901 establishments in Utah
Buildings and structures in Salt Lake City